Hacı Mehmet Zorlu (1919 in Babadağ, Denizli – May 7, 2005 in Istanbul) was the founder of Zorlu Holding, one of the biggest group of companies in Turkey.

References

1919 births
2005 deaths
People from Babadağ, Denizli
20th-century Turkish businesspeople